Souad Aït Salem, also known as Souad Aït Mahour-Bacha (born 6 January 1979 in Mécheria, Algeria) is an Algerian long-distance runner who specializes mainly in the half marathon and marathon. She won gold in the 10,000 metres at the 2000 African Championships in Athletics and the 2005 Mediterranean Games. Salem also won the gold in the half marathon at the 2007 All-Africa Games. She holds the Algerian records for every women's event between 3000 metres and the marathon distance.

Her first appearance on the world stage was in the junior race at the 1997 IAAF World Cross Country Championships, where she finished in 98th place. Salem reached the top fifty at the 2000 and 2003 IAAF World Half Marathon Championships. She ran in the 5000 metres at the 2003 World Championships in Athletics and the 2004 Summer Olympics but did not progress beyond her heat in either competition.

After winning the Universiade cross country competition, Salem switched to the marathon distance in 2006 and the move paid off: she won the 2006 Alexander The Great Marathon in Thessaloniki. She won the women's race at the 13th Rome Marathon on 18 March 2007. Her time was 2:25:08 hrs was a new course record. She finished 9th in the women's marathon at the 2008 Beijing Olympics, with a time of 2:28:29 hrs. At the 2007 World Championships in Athletics, she finished 16th in the marathon race. She finished sixth at the London Marathon in 2008 and went on to finish in ninth place in the women's marathon race at the 2008 Beijing Olympics.

After a long break from competition, she ran her first marathon in almost four years at the Prague Marathon. She finished in fourth place with a time of 2:27:21 hours. She raced in the marathon at the 2012 Summer Olympics, finishing in 37th place.

In 2017 she tested positive for Torasemide and was banned from competition for 18 months between 11 March 2017 and 8 October 2018.

Personal bests
3000 metres – 8:47.99 min (2006)
5000 metres – 15:07.49 min (2006)
10,000 metres – 32:13.15 min (2004)
20 kilometres – 1:06:11 hrs (2006)
Half marathon – 1:09:15 hrs (2008)
Marathon – 2:25:08 hrs (2007)

Achievements

References

External links



1979 births
Living people
People from Naâma Province
Algerian female long-distance runners
Algerian female marathon runners
Olympic athletes of Algeria
Athletes (track and field) at the 2004 Summer Olympics
Athletes (track and field) at the 2008 Summer Olympics
Athletes (track and field) at the 2012 Summer Olympics
Athletes (track and field) at the 2016 Summer Olympics
World Athletics Championships athletes for Algeria
Mediterranean Games gold medalists for Algeria
Mediterranean Games silver medalists for Algeria
Mediterranean Games bronze medalists for Algeria
Athletes (track and field) at the 2005 Mediterranean Games
Athletes (track and field) at the 2013 Mediterranean Games
Athletes (track and field) at the 2022 Mediterranean Games
African Games gold medalists for Algeria
African Games medalists in athletics (track and field)
Doping cases in athletics
Algerian sportspeople in doping cases
Mediterranean Games medalists in athletics
Athletes (track and field) at the 2007 All-Africa Games
21st-century Algerian people